Minuscule 837 (in the Gregory-Aland numbering), ε415 (von Soden), is a 14th-century Greek minuscule manuscript of the New Testament on parchment. The manuscript is lacunose.

Description 
The codex contains the texts of the Gospel of Matthew (1:17-5:30; 17:24-24:29; 27:60-28:20) and Gospel of Mark (1:1-32), on 29 parchment leaves (size ). The text is written in two columns per page, 27 lines per page.

There is also another division according to the smaller Ammonian Sections, with references to the Eusebian Canons.

Text 
Kurt Aland did not place the Greek text of the codex in any Category.

History 

Currently the manuscript is dated by the INTF to the 14th century.

The manuscript was examined and described by Angelo Maria Bandini. It was added to the list of New Testament manuscripts by Gregory (837e). Gregory saw it in 1886. It was later catalogued again as minuscule 2580 on the list Gregory-Aland. Number 2580 was cancelled.

Currently the manuscript is housed at the Laurentian Library (I. 94 suss., fol. 38-66), in Florence.

See also 

 List of New Testament minuscules
 Biblical manuscript
 Textual criticism
 Minuscule 836

References

Further reading

External links 
 

Greek New Testament minuscules
14th-century biblical manuscripts